Rotte can refer to:

 German military airplane formation, see Organization of the Luftwaffe (1933–45)#Schwarm, Rotte and Kette
 Rotte (river) in the Netherlands
 Another name for the psaltery
 Rotte (instrument) or German lyre, a medieval string instrument

See also
 Rott (disambiguation)